Georgia is a 1988 Australian thriller film directed by Ben Lewin (in his theatrical film directing debut) and starring Judy Davis.

Plot
Judy Davis plays the two roles of a mother, Georgia, and her daughter Nina. The film is presented as a series of flashbacks as Nina investigates her mother's death, which led to her adoption as a young child.

Cast
 Judy Davis as Nina Bailley/Georgia White
 John Bach as Karlin
 Julia Blake as Elizabeth
 Alex Menglet as Lazlo
 Marshall Napier as Frank Le Mat

Production
The film was inspired by Albert Tucker's 1984 painting of Joy Hester. Producer Bob Weis originally wanted to make a film based on Hester's life but decided to make a fictional film.

Box office performance
Georgia grossed $44,205 at the box office in Australia.

See also
Cinema of Australia

References

External links
 
 Georgia at the National Film and Sound Archive
Georgia at Oz Movies

1988 films
Australian thriller films
1980s English-language films
Films shot in Melbourne
1988 thriller films
Films directed by Ben Lewin
1988 directorial debut films
1980s Australian films